Ph.D. were a British duo best known for their UK top 10 hit "I Won't Let You Down" in April 1982, which had been a hit the previous year throughout Europe. 

The band was a duo, but it took its name from the initial letters of the surnames of the three performers on the group's original recordings: Phillips, Hymas and Diamond.  Though drummer Simon Phillips appears on a number of the band's tracks as a session player, he was not a official member of Ph.D., which consisted of keyboard player Tony Hymas and vocalist Jim Diamond.

Band history
Jim Diamond formed the group with former Jeff Beck Group member Tony Hymas in 1980.  Vocalist Diamond wrote the lyrics, multi-instrumentalist Hymas wrote the music, and all publicity, video clips, and official album credits made it clear that the group was a duo of Diamond and Hymas.  Simon Phillips, also a previous member of The Jeff Beck Group, was brought in as a frequent session drummer, though drummer Mark Craney was also used on some tracks.  

Their duo's self-titled debut album (1981), spawned a hit with their ballad "I Won't Let You Down", which peaked at number three on the UK Singles Chart in 1982, and number five in Australia. Following the single's success, the album was re-issued and finally entered the UK Albums Chart.

Their music video for "Little Suzi's on the Up" was notable for being the fifth video shown on MTV's first broadcasting day on 1 August 1981, despite the fact that the song did not chart in America (nor did any of Ph.D.'s singles or albums).

Ph.D.released their second album Is It Safe? in 1983, with Phillips and Craney again alternating as drummer from song to song. The first single, "I Didn't Know", failed to make the UK top 40, but did well in Europe.

A short time later Diamond contracted hepatitis. Prevented by his illness from touring, the group disbanded.

After Ph.D.
Diamond returned some time later as a solo artist and scored a UK No. 1 single in November 1984 with "I Should Have Known Better". Hymas appeared on Diamond's self-titled 1988 album Jim Diamond. Diamond and Hymas reformed the group in 2006. Reissues of the first two albums were released by Voiceprint Records.  The label also released Three on 2 February 2009, with Phillips drumming on three tracks. (The duo's other frequently-used session drummer, Mark Craney, had died in 2005.)

Jim Diamond died on 8 October 2015.

Band members
 Jim Diamond – vocals (1981–1983, 2006–2015; died 2015)
 Tony Hymas – keyboards (1981–1983, 2006–2015)

Frequent session drummers:
 Simon Phillips – drums (1981–1983, 2009)
 Mark Craney – drums (1981–1983)

Discography

Studio albums

Singles

References

External links
 Jim Diamond official website
 Tony Hymas official website
 Little Suzi's on the Up Music Video on YouTube

English new wave musical groups
English pop music groups
British musical trios
British synth-pop new wave groups
Musical groups established in 1981
Musical groups disestablished in 1983
Musical groups reestablished in 2006
Musical groups disestablished in 2015
Atlantic Records artists
Voiceprint Records artists
Warner Music Group artists